Jacob F. Raub (May 13, 1840 – May 21, 1906) was an American soldier and surgeon who fought with the Union Army in the American Civil War. Raub received his country's highest award for bravery during combat, the Medal of Honor, for actions taken on February 5, 1865, during the Battle of Hatcher's Run.

Civil War service
Raub served with the 210th Pennsylvania Infantry Regiment during the Civil War as an assistant surgeon. On February 5, 1865, during the Battle of Hatcher's Run, Raub volunteered to tend wounded soldiers in the middle of severe gunfire and then took up arms himself and began to fight after noticing Confederate soldiers about to launch a surprise attack from a position his regiment was initially not prepared to defend. He received the Medal of Honor on April 20, 1896, some 31 years after his actions.

Medal of Honor citation

Personal life
Raub was born in Raubsville, Pennsylvania, on May 13, 1840.

Jacob married Jane S. Weaver, the third of nine siblings, on September 16, 1864. The couple had three children, born in 1867, 1870, and 1874, respectively.

Raub attained a Doctor of Medicine degree in 1864.

Raub and his wife Jane S. (1842–1908) are buried at Arlington National Cemetery.

References

1840 births
1906 deaths
American Civil War recipients of the Medal of Honor
People from Northampton County, Pennsylvania
People of Pennsylvania in the American Civil War
United States Army Medal of Honor recipients
Burials at Arlington National Cemetery
Union Army surgeons